Cristian Matías Menéndez (born 2 April 1988) is an Argentine professional footballer that currently plays for Tucumán.

Club career

Lanús
Menéndez began playing in 2007 for Lanús. He made his debut in a remarkable 2–6 home defeat to Arsenal de Sarandí on 2 May 2008. His first goal for the club came on 14 March 2009 in a 2–1 home win against Colón. In 2009, he gained his first experiences of international club football featuring in 2 Copa Libertadores 2009 and 2 Copa Sudamericana 2009 games.

Emelec
On 5 June 2010 left Club Atlético Lanús and joined on loan with sold option to Club Sport Emelec. While there, he tweeted a racist and insulting comment regarding Ecuatorians (and Bolivians as well); his loan was canceled and he had to leave Ecuador.

Libertad
In 2011, he was loaned to Libertad of Paraguay.

Honours
Lanús
Torneo de Apertura: 2007

Emelec
Ecuadorian Serie A: Runner–up 2010

References

External links
 
 Cristian Menéndez – Argentine Primera statistics at Fútbol XXI 
 Cristian Menéndez at Football-Lineups
 

1988 births
Living people
Sportspeople from Mar del Plata
Argentine footballers
Association football forwards
Argentine expatriate footballers
Club Atlético Lanús footballers
C.S. Emelec footballers
Club Libertad footballers
Quilmes Atlético Club footballers
Atlético Tucumán footballers
C.D. Veracruz footballers
Club Puebla players
Everton de Viña del Mar footballers
Argentine Primera División players
Primera Nacional players
Paraguayan Primera División players
Ecuadorian Serie A players
Liga MX players
Chilean Primera División players
Argentine expatriate sportspeople in Paraguay
Argentine expatriate sportspeople in Ecuador
Argentine expatriate sportspeople in Mexico
Argentine expatriate sportspeople in Chile
Expatriate footballers in Paraguay
Expatriate footballers in Ecuador
Expatriate footballers in Mexico
Expatriate footballers in Chile